Tanjung Pengelih is a small town in Pengerang, Kota Tinggi District, Johor, Malaysia. The Tanjung Pengelih historical British Military Operation Centre fortress during World War II is located here. The Royal Malaysian Naval Academy (PULAREK TLDM)  is also in Tanjung Pengelih.

References

Kota Tinggi District
Towns in Johor